The United States women's national ice sledge hockey team is the national team representing the United States in women's international sledge hockey. The team competed at the IPC International Cup and now competes at the Para Ice Hockey Women's World Challenge. Since the 2018-2019 season the team has been under the governance of USA Hockey.

The team participated in its first International Paralympic Committee-sanctioned international competition, the 2014 IPC Ice Sledge Hockey Women's International Cup now known as the Para Ice Hockey Women's World Challenge (a World Para Ice Hockey sanctioned event) whose inaugural year was in 2022.

See also
Canada women's national ice sledge hockey team
United States men's national ice sledge hockey team

References

National ice sledge hockey teams
Para ice hockey